is a former Japanese football player. She played for Japan national team.

Club career
Yano was born in Yokohama on June 3, 1984. After graduating from Kanagawa University, she joined Urawa Reds in 2007. In 2007 season, she was selected Best Young Player awards. She retired end of 2012 season. In 6 seasons, she played 111 matches in L.League and she was selected Best Eleven every season.

National team career
In June 2003, Yano was a Kanagawa University student, she was selected to play for the Japan national team at the 2003 AFC Championship. At this competition, on June 11, she debuted and scored a goal against Guam. She played at the World Cup 3 times (2003, 2007 and 2011) and at the Summer Olympics 3 times (2004, 2008 and 2012). Japan won the championship at the 2011 World Cup and silver medal at the 2012 Summer Olympics. She played 74 games and scored 1 goals for Japan until 2012.

Club statistics

National team statistics

Honors

Club Team
 L.League
 Champion (1): 2009

National Team
 FIFA Women's World Cup
 Champion (1): 2011
 Asian Games
 Gold Medal (1): 2010
 East Asian Football Championship
 Champions (2): 2008, 2010

References

External links

1984 births
Living people
Kanagawa University alumni
Association football people from Kanagawa Prefecture
Japanese women's footballers
Japan women's international footballers
Nadeshiko League players
Urawa Red Diamonds Ladies players
FIFA Women's World Cup-winning players
2003 FIFA Women's World Cup players
2007 FIFA Women's World Cup players
2011 FIFA Women's World Cup players
Olympic footballers of Japan
Olympic silver medalists for Japan
Olympic medalists in football
Medalists at the 2012 Summer Olympics
Footballers at the 2004 Summer Olympics
Footballers at the 2008 Summer Olympics
Footballers at the 2012 Summer Olympics
Asian Games medalists in football
Asian Games gold medalists for Japan
Asian Games silver medalists for Japan
Medalists at the 2006 Asian Games
Medalists at the 2010 Asian Games
Footballers at the 2006 Asian Games
Footballers at the 2010 Asian Games
Women's association football defenders